A logistics center, or depot, is a facility dedicated to logistical operations. A logistics center might be a warehouse, freight forwarder, or a repair depot.

The United States Air Force (USAF) is serviced by three air logistics centers (also known as depots) at which Maintenance, repair, and overhaul (MRO) operations are performed:

 Ogden Air Logistics Center (OO-ALC)
 Warner Robins Air Logistics Center (WR-ALC)
 Oklahoma City Air Logistics Center (OC-ALC)

See also
 Precision measurement equipment laboratory
 Distribution center

Logistics